Saccharate can refer to either
a salt or ester of saccharic acid
or a metallic derivative of a sugar, especially sucrose (thus a sucrate), usually with a bivalent metal (not used systematically)

See also
Strontian process, involving strontium saccharate